Bifurcia is a genus of Asian dwarf spiders that was first described by Michael I. Saaristo, L. H. Tu & S. Q. Li in 2006.

Species
 it contains nine species, all from China and far eastern Russia:
Bifurcia cucurbita Zhai & Zhu, 2007 – China
Bifurcia curvata (Sha & Zhu, 1987) – China
Bifurcia dersuuzalai Fomichev & Omelko, 2021 – Russia (Far East)
Bifurcia maritima (Tanasevitch, 2010) – Russia (Far East)
Bifurcia oligerae Marusik, Omelko & Koponen, 2016 – Russia (Far East)
Bifurcia pseudosongi Quan & Chen, 2012 – China
Bifurcia ramosa (Li & Zhu, 1987) (type) – China
Bifurcia songi Zhai & Zhu, 2007 – China
Bifurcia tanasevitchi Marusik, Omelko & Koponen, 2016 – Russia (Far East)

See also
 List of Linyphiidae species

References

Araneomorphae genera
Linyphiidae
Spiders of Asia
Taxa named by Michael Saaristo